The  was a professional wrestling round-robin tournament held by DDT Pro-Wrestling to promote their younger talents. Only two editions were held, in 2009 and 2010.

The tournament was held under a points system, with 2 points for a win, 1 for a draw, and 0 for a loss. Contestants fought in a single block with the best two scoring contestants advancing to a final match.

The 2009 edition was won by Keisuke Ishii, and the 2010 edition was won by Soma Takao.

Results

2009
The inaugural Young Drama Cup ran from September 13, 2009 to October 25.

2010
The 2010 edition of the Young Drama Cup ran from October 14, 2010 to November 28.

See also
Young Lion Cup
DDT Pro-Wrestling
Professional wrestling in Japan

References

External links

Wrestle Universe

DDT Pro-Wrestling
Professional wrestling tournaments